Gliese 674 (GJ 674) is a small red dwarf star with an exoplanetary companion in the southern constellation of Ara. It is too faint to be visible to the naked eye, having an apparent visual magnitude of 9.38 and an absolute magnitude of 11.09. The system is located at a distance of 14.8 light-years from the Sun based on parallax measurements, but is drifting closer with a radial velocity of −2.9 km/s. It is a candidate member of the 200 million year old Castor stream of co-moving stars.

This is a low-mass M-type main-sequence star with a stellar classification of M3V. The star is weakly active and show star spots on a regular basis. GJ 674 is at an intermediate stage of spin-down with a rotation period of 33.4 days, suggesting an age of up to a few billion years. It is smaller and less massive than the Sun, and is radiating just 1.6% of the Sun's luminosity from its photosphere at an effective temperature of 3,404 K.

Planetary system
On January 7, 2007, Bonfils used the HARPS spectrograph in ESO and found an intermediate mass planet orbiting close to the red dwarf star in an eccentric orbit. This system is a promising candidate for detecting radio emission caused by interaction between the planet and the stellar wind.

See also
 List of nearest stars
 List of extrasolar planets

References

External links
 
 
 GJ 674 Catalog
 Image Gliese 674

Notes

M-type main-sequence stars
Planetary systems with one confirmed planet
Local Bubble

Ara (constellation)
CD-46 11540
 
0674
085523